The seizure of Abu Musa and the Greater and Lesser Tunbs by the Imperial Iranian Navy took place on 30 November 1971, shortly after the withdrawal of British forces from the islands of Abu Musa and the Greater and Lesser Tunbs, all located in the Strait of Hormuz between the Persian Gulf and the Gulf of Oman. The Imperial State of Iran had claimed sovereignty over both sets of islands, while the Emirate of Ras al-Khaimah claimed the Greater and Lesser Tunbs and the Emirate of Sharjah claimed Abu Musa.

Following the seizure of the islands by Iran, both the emirates of Sharjah and Ras al-Khaimah acceded to the newly formed United Arab Emirates, doing so on 2 December 1971 and 10 February 1972, respectively, causing the United Arab Emirates to inherit the territorial dispute with Iran over the islands. , the islands remain disputed between the United Arab Emirates and the Islamic Republic of Iran.

On the ground, Iran has maintained its control over the islands since their seizure in 1971, while the United Arab Emirates has made several attempts through international channels to regain sovereign control of the islands.

Background
According to Iranologist Pirouz Mojtahedzadeh, the Tunbs were in the dominions of the kings of Hormuz from 1330 until 1507 when they were invaded by Portugal. The Portuguese occupied the island until 1622, when they were expelled by Shah Abbas. The islands were part of various Persian Empires from 1622 to 7 June 1921, when they were occupied by the British Empire and were put under administration of the Emirate of Sharjah.

On 29 November 1971, shortly before the end of the British protectorate and the formation of the United Arab Emirates, Iran and the ruler of Sharjah signed a memorandum of understanding (MoU) for the joint administration of Abu Musa. Under the MoU, Sharjah was to have a local police station on Abu Musa and Iran was to station troops on the island according to a map attached to the MoU. Iran and Sharjah were each to have full jurisdiction in the designated areas and their flags were to continue to fly. The MoU provided for equal distribution of petroleum oil revenues. It has been said that the ruler of Sharjah had no other feasible option but to sign the MoU. He either had to negotiate to save part of his territory or forego the restoration of the remaining part of the island for good. On the same day Iran occupied the Greater and Lesser Tunbs.

A day later, on 30 November 1971, Iran seized Abu Musa.

Operation

At dawn on 29 November 1971, helicopters circled Abu Musa and dropped leaflets, written in Persian, telling residents who were mostly farmers and fishermen to surrender.

At 5:30 pm on 29 November 1971, a contingent of the Iranian army supported by Imperial Iranian Navy forces invaded the Lesser and Greater Tunbs. In the Tunbs, the ruler of Ras Al Khaimah, Sheikh Saqr bin Mohammed Al Qasimi, who did not have a signed agreement with Iran, resisted the Iranian troops. On Greater Tunb, the Iranians ordered the six policemen stationed there to lower the flag. Salem Suhail bin Khamis, the head policeman, refused to comply and was shot and killed. Policemen in Greater Tunb clashed with the Iranian troops and in the ensuing skirmish four Ras Al Khaimah policemen and three Iranian soldiers were killed. The Iranian troops then demolished the police station, the school, and a number of houses, and forced the natives to leave the island. The body of the deceased were buried on the island and the residents were put on fishing boats and expelled to Ras Al Khaimah. The Iranian naval forces seized the islands with little resistance from the tiny Arab police force stationed there. The population of the Greater Tunb in 1971 was 150. According to author Richard N. Schofield, a source states that the 120 Arab civilian population of Greater Tunb was then deported, but according to other reports the island had already been uninhabited for some time earlier.

On 30 November 1971, an Iranian contingent landed on Abu Musa to occupy the part of the island alluded to in the memorandum of understanding with Sharjah. It was led by the commandant of the navy who was received by the deputy ruler of Sharjah and some aides. On the same day, Iranian Prime Minister officially broke the news of the seizure of the islands of Lesser and Greater Tunbs and the partial occupation of Abu Musa and stated that the Iranian flag had been hoisted on the tip of Haifa mountain, the highest point in Abu Musa. He said Iran's sovereignty of the islands was restored following prolonged talks with the British government and declared that Iran would not abandon its sovereignty over the whole of Abu Musa and accordingly, the presence of local officials in certain parts of the island was inconsistent with Iran's sovereignty over the whole island.

Casualties 
Iran announced that three of its troops were killed and one was wounded, while killing four policemen and injuring five others. The UAE has claimed one policeman to have died while defending the island.

Aftermath
Iran justified the takeover, claiming that the islands were part of the Persian Empire since the 6th century BCE. The claim was disputed by the UAE which claimed that Arabs maintained control and sovereignty of the islands since the 7th century BCE. However, there is no surviving documentation from pre-colonial times regarding the sovereignty of the islands. The earliest known record regarding sovereignty is a report by the Portuguese in 1518 that the islands were inhabited and ruled by Arabs.

In the decades following the takeover, the issue remained a source of friction between the UAE and Iran. Negotiations between the UAE and Iran in 1992 failed. The UAE attempted to bring the dispute before the International Court of Justice, but Iran refused. Iran says the islands always belonged to it as it had never renounced possession of the islands, and that they are part of Iranian territory. The UAE argues that the islands were under the control of Qasimi sheikhs throughout the 19th century, whose rights were then inherited by the UAE in 1971. Iran counters by stating that the local Qasimi rulers during a relevant part of the 19th century were actually based on the Iranian, not the Arab, coast, and had thus become Persian subjects.

In 1980, the UAE took its claim to the United Nations, but the claim was deferred by the UN Security Council at that time and it was not revisited. 
According to author Thomas Mattair, executive director of Middle East Policy Council (MEPC), given that Iran has consistently refused to consider mediation or arbitration from third-party groups such as the ICJ, Mattair considers the invasion a violation of Article 33 of the United Nations Charter.

Memorandum of understanding

See also
 Iran–United Arab Emirates relations

References

Battles involving Iran
History of the United Arab Emirates
Conflicts in 1971
Mohammad Reza Pahlavi
1971 in Iran
Islands of the Persian Gulf
Iran–United Arab Emirates relations
Disputed territories in Asia